The reign of the emperor Diocletian (284−305) marked the final widespread persecution of Christians in the Roman Empire. The most intense period of violence came after Diocletian issued an edict in 303 more strictly enforcing adherence to the traditional religious practices of Rome in conjunction with the Imperial cult. Modern historians estimate that during this period, known as the Diocletianic or Great Persecution and extending several years beyond the reign of Diocletian, as many as 3,000−3,500 Christians were executed under the authority of Imperial edicts.

The church historian Eusebius, a Bishop of Caesarea who lived through both the "Little Peace" of the Church and the Great Persecution, is a major source for identifying Christian martyrs in this period. Martyr narratives flourished later as a genre of Christian literature, but are not contemporary with the persecutions and are often of dubious historicity. This article lists both historical and legendary figures traditionally identified as martyrs during the reign of Diocletian.

Martyrs of Palestine 

The names of the following martyrs are recorded by Eusebius in his work The Martyrs of Palestine:
 Procopius of Scythopolis, 7 July, 303
 Timolaus and Companions, 303
 Alphaeus and Zacchaeus, 303 or 304
 Romanus of Caesarea, 303 or 304
 Aphian, 2 April, 305

Martyrs of Nicomedia
In his Church History, Eusebius discusses the martyrdoms at Nicomedia, naming two:
Gorgonius of Nicomedia, 304
Anthimus of Nicomedia, 304

Attested in early sources

 Shmona and Gurya, c.297, as recorded in the Acts of Shmona and of Gurya c.309
 Saint Sebastian, c.288, first attested by Ambrose, bishop of Milan 374–397
 Euphemia, 303, attested in the Martyrologium Hieronymianum and the Fasti vindobonenses
 Felix and Adauctus, c.303, attested in the works of Pope Gregory I (late 6th century) and in a miraculous martyrology by Ado in the 9th century that may have drawn on a 4th-century record by Pope Damasus I
 Agnes of Rome, c.304, recorded by Ambrose
 Marcellinus and Peter, 304, first recorded by Damasus

Others 

Chrysanthus and Daria, according to the Martyrologium Hieronymianum
Nicasius, Quirinus, Scubiculus, and Pientia, according to tradition
Castulus and his wife Irene of Rome, according to tradition
Mark and Marcellian, according to tradition 
Saint Tiburtius and Saint Susanna, according to legend
Victor of Marseilles, according to tradition
Pope Caius, according to legend
Gabinus, died c.300, according to tradition
Sabinus of Spoleto, c.300, according to tradition
Anthony of Antioch, Celsus and Marcionilla, according to tradition
Eulalia of Barcelona, February 12, 303, according to tradition
Quirinus of Tegernsee, according to legend
Engratia, 303, according to tradition
George, April 23, 303, according to tradition
Victor Maurus, c.303, according to tradition
Agathius, May 8, 303, according to tradition
Erasmus of Formiae, c.303, according to tradition
Vitus, according to legend
Cyriacus, according to tradition
Alexander of Bergamo, according to legend
Anastasius of Antioch, Julian and Basilissa, according to tradition
Lucy, 304, according to tradition
Vincent of Saragossa, c.304, according to tradition
Victoria of Albitina, c.304, according to tradition
Agape, Chionia, and Irene, 304, according to tradition
Fidelis of Como, c.304, according to tradition
Acisclus of Córdoba, 304, according to tradition
Leocadia of Toledo, c.304, according to tradition
Quiricus and Julietta, 304, according to tradition
Eulalia of Mérida, according to tradition
Proculus of Pozzuoli, and Januarius, c.305, according to tradition
Vincent, Orontius, and Victor  305, according to tradition
Chrysogonus, according to tradition
Cantius, Cantianus, and Cantianilla, 304, reported by Maximus of Turin and Venantius Fortunatus
Cessianus, 303
Acacius of Sebaste, according to tradition
Anastasia of Sirmium, according to tradition
Archelais and Companions
Philomena, according to tradition
Pancras of Rome, according to tradition
Verissimus, Maxima, and Julia, c. 303, first attested in the Martyrology of Usuard (8th century)

See also 

 List of Christian women of the patristic age

Citations

References
 Frend, William H.C. Martyrdom and persecution in the early church: a study of a conflict from the Maccabees to Donatus. New York University Press, 1967. Reissued in 2008 by James Clarke Company, U.K.  
 Liebeschuetz, J. H. W. G. Continuity and Change in Roman Religion. Oxford: Oxford University Press, 1979. 

 
Martyrs, Diocletian
 
 
Diocletian
Diocletian